Larisa Sergeevna Sergeeva; born  March 7, 1946, Yalta) is a Soviet and Russian artist, designer, and teacher.

Recognition and awards
She is an honoured artist of the Russian Federation (2013) and an honorary artist of the Autonomous Republic of Crimea (2009). She is a member of the Creative Union of Russian Artists, the Union of the Russian Designers, the Association of Art Critics of the Creative Union of Art historians and Art Critics, Asociación Pintores Pastelistas Españoles - ASPAS, L'association de pastellistes  L'art de cœur de l'art de Lyon en France, Emeritus guest of the Ministry of Culture of Italy (2008).

Career
She is a teacher of the highest category, a licensed expert in children's art in the city of Moscow and greater Moscow region.

References

External links
 Русская живопись

1946 births
Living people
Russian artists
People from Yalta
Russian art critics
Soviet designers
Soviet art historians
Russian art historians
Russian women historians
Russian women critics
Russian academics
Moscow State Textile University alumni